Samuel Christy-Miller, originally Samuel Christy and from 1862 by royal licence actually Samuel Christie Miller  (1810–1889) was an English businessman and politician, from 1847 to 1859 one of the two members of parliament for Newcastle-under-Lyme, elected as a Peelite.

Life
He was the second son of Thomas Christy of Essex, eldest son of Miller Christy, and Rebecca Hawlings. He became a partner in the hat-making firm Christy & Co.

Christy was related, though distantly, to William Henry Miller, who died in 1848. He inherited indirectly from Miller an estate, and a noted library, in 1852. At that point he changed surname to Christy-Miller. Miller had been Member of Parliament for Newcastle-under-Lyme, and Christy-Miller also stood successfully for that constituency. He was a Peelite.

Notes

1810 births
1889 deaths
Conservative Party (UK) MPs for English constituencies
UK MPs 1841–1847
UK MPs 1847–1852
UK MPs 1852–1857
UK MPs 1857–1859
Members of the Parliament of the United Kingdom for Newcastle-under-Lyme
19th-century English businesspeople